Cecilia Phalen Abbott (born November 13, 1959) is the First Lady of Texas. She is married to Greg Abbott, and is the first Hispanic First Lady of Texas.

Personal life
Cecilia Phalen was born on November 13, 1959. Abbott was raised in San Antonio, Texas by her parents, both of whom were educators, and she had three siblings. Abbott graduated from Thomas Jefferson High School. She then attended the University of Texas at Austin, where she met her future husband, Greg Abbott. She later attended the University of St. Thomas, where she received a bachelor's degree in psychology, a master's degree in education, and a master's degree in theology. She married Greg Abbott in 1981, with whom she shares a birthday. They have one adopted daughter, Audrey. The Abbott family lives in the Texas Governors Mansion in Austin, Texas. They have two dogs: Pancake, known as the First Dog of Texas, and Peaches, known as the First Puppy of Texas.

Career
Abbott has been a principal at various Catholic schools in Texas; most recently, she served as principal of Cathedral School of Saint Mary in Austin between 1996 and 2001. She later worked in the health care industry as a Managing Director of Community Relations for a senior adult health care company. Throughout her career, she has served on various boards and organizations. Abbott took the position of First of Lady of Texas on January 20, 2015, succeeding Anita Thigpen Perry. Abbott is the first Hispanic First Lady of Texas. Abbott is a Republican.

References

1959 births
Living people
First Ladies and Gentlemen of Texas
American people of Mexican descent
People from San Antonio
Texas Republicans